The air fern (Sertularia argentea) is a species of marine animal in the family Sertulariidae. It is also known as the sea fir and Neptune plant.

These so-called "ferns" are dead and dried colonies of hydrozoans, colonies of marine hydroids, class Hydrozoa, phylum Cnidaria.  Hydroids are related to corals and jellyfish.

These dried hydroid colonies are commonly sold as a curiosity, as a decorative "indoor plant", or as underwater decorations for aquaria in stores.  They are sometimes labeled as "Neptune plants".  Despite a superficial resemblance to plants, they are actually animal skeletons or shells.  The dried colonies are often dyed green, but, when soaked in water, the coloring will dissolve. 

The fernlike branches of S. argentea are composed of many small, chitinous chambers where individual animals once lived. When the colony was alive, a polyp with numerous tentacles occupied each of the chambers, called hydrotheca.

Sometimes dried bryozoa are sold as "air ferns."

Most commercially sold air ferns are collected as a by-product by trawlers in the North Sea.

References

External links
Wayne's word on Air ferns

Sertulariidae
Animals described in 1758
Taxa named by Carl Linnaeus